Alfred T. Bonnabel Magnet Academy  High School is a comprehensive public high school in Kenner, Louisiana, United States, and is part of Jefferson Parish Public Schools, the largest public school system in Louisiana. Bonnabel is the only high school in Kenner, and serves most of Kenner and parts of Metairie.

East Jefferson High School had been using "A.M. & P.M. platoon shifts" where the first classes went to school from 6 a.m. until noon, and the second shift went from 12:30 to 6:30. In 1973 they started building a new all male school named Alfred T. Bonnabel High. Even though it would not be completed until 2 years later, they decided to call the morning shift “Bonnabel” and the afternoon shift “East Jefferson”. The following year the two shifts flip-flopped. The third year the student that had been using the name “Bonnabel” moved into their new building just north of I-10 between David Dr. and Williams Blvd.

Campus
The school is on a  property in Kenner. Ray Ferrand, the principal in 2002, said during that year that, as paraphrased by Megan Kamerick of the New Orleans CityBusiness, the school could be "overwhelming" for first time students. Bonnabel's main campus includes multiple academic buildings spread across, including a building dedicated exclusively to Freshman students. The campus also consists of a full sized Baseball and Softball field, field house, and gym. A memorial garden for a student killed in 2016 was also dedicated in May 2016 by the class of 2017 and administrators

Demographics
Bonnabel High School is a Title I school that has 1421 students (530 9th grade, 337 10th grade, 311 11th grade, 243 12th grade).  Bonnabel has 579 black students, 400 Hispanic students, 370 white students, 69 Asian students, and 3 students of American Indian or Alaskan descent.  664 students are eligible for free lunch.

In 2002 it had about 1,750 students.

Athletics
Bonnabel High athletics competes in the LHSAA.

See also

List of high schools in Louisiana

References

External links
 

Public high schools in Louisiana
Schools in Jefferson Parish, Louisiana